Muddayi is a 1987 Indian Telugu-language action film directed by K. S. R. Das who also wrote the screenplay. Chakravarthy scored and composed the film's soundtrack. Produced by Vadde Balaji Rao under Sri Balaji Art movies, Muddayi was released on 3 July 1987 to generally positive reviews.
 The film featured an ensemble cast of Krishna Ghattamaneni, Vijayashanti, Radha, Sharada, Sarath Babu and Tiger Prabhakar in the lead roles. The film was edited by P. Venkateswara Rao while Pushpala Gopi handled the cinematography. The movie is a remake of 1982 Kannada film Jimmy Gallu.
The film was remade by the director in Hindi in 1988 as Mulzim.

Cast 
 Krishna Ghattamaneni as Nagendra
 Vijayashanti as Malathi
 Radha as Rekha
 Sharada as Vijaya Chamundeswari
 Sarath Babu as Aruna Kumar
 Tiger Prabhakar as Ranjit Kumar
 Giribabu
 Mucherla Aruna

Soundtrack 

Soundtrack composed by K. Chakravarthy was released through Saptaswar music label. Lyrics were written by Veturi, Sirivennela Seetharama Sastry, Jaladi and Vennelakanti.

References

External links 

1987 films
1980s Telugu-language films
Telugu remakes of Kannada films
Telugu films remade in other languages